In enzymology, a 6-O-methylnorlaudanosoline 5'-O-methyltransferase is an enzyme that catalyzes the chemical reaction

S-adenosyl-L-methionine + 6-O-methylnorlaudanosoline  S-adenosyl-L-homocysteine + nororientaline

Thus, the two substrates of this enzyme are S-adenosyl methionine and 6-O-methylnorlaudanosoline, whereas its two products are S-adenosylhomocysteine and nororientaline.

This enzyme belongs to the family of transferases, specifically those transferring one-carbon group methyltransferases.  The systematic name of this enzyme class is S-adenosyl-L-methionine:6-O-methylnorlaudanosoline 5'-O-methyltransferase. This enzyme participates in alkaloid biosynthesis i.

References

 

EC 2.1.1
Enzymes of unknown structure